Massih Massihnia, is a retired Iranian footballer.

Club career

Played for Bank Melli F.C., Persepolis F.C., F.C. Aboumoslem, Sepahan F.C.

International career
He featured for the Iran national team at 1974 Asian Games, 1974 Iran International Tournament, 1975 Iran International Tournament and qualification for 1976 Olympic Games.

References

Iran international footballers
Iranian footballers
F.C. Aboomoslem players
Sepahan S.C. footballers
Living people
Homa F.C. players
Persepolis F.C. players
Asian Games gold medalists for Iran
1955 births
Asian Games medalists in football
Association football defenders
Medalists at the 1974 Asian Games
Footballers at the 1974 Asian Games
20th-century Iranian people